Bumetopia sakishimana is a species of beetle in the family Cerambycidae. It was described by Hayashi in 1966.

Subspecies
 Bumetopia sakishimana ishigaki Hayashi, 1966
 Bumetopia sakishimana sakishimana Hayashi, 1966
 Bumetopia sakishimana yonaguni Hayashi, 1966

References

Homonoeini
Beetles described in 1966